= 2006 Liechtenstein dogs referendum =

- 5 November 2006
- Referendum on an amendment to a law on dog keeping

Results
Choice	Votes	%
Yes	6,276	62.68%
No	3,736	37.32%
Valid votes	10,012	96.35%
Invalid or blank votes	379	3.65%
Total votes	10,391	100.00%
Registered voters/turnout	17,828	58.28%
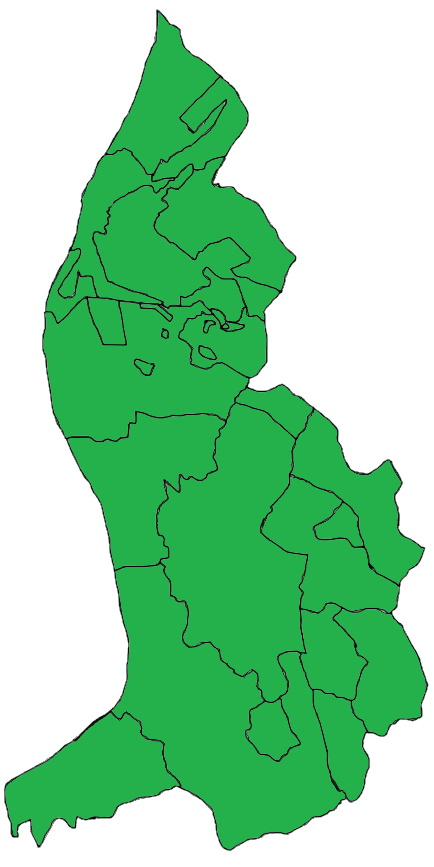
- Results by municipality

A referendum on a new law on dog breeding was held in Liechtenstein on 5 November 2006. The proposal was approved by 63% of voters.

== Results ==
Choice	Votes	%
For	6,276	62.68
Against	3,736	37.32
Total	10,012	100.00
Valid votes	10,012	96.35
Invalid/blank votes	379	3.65
Total votes	10,391	100.00
Registered voters/turnout	17,828	58.28
Source: Nohlen & Stöver
